The 2015–16 Winthrop Eagles men's basketball team represented Winthrop University during the 2015–16 NCAA Division I men's basketball season. The Eagles, led by fourth year head coach Pat Kelsey, played their home games at the Winthrop Coliseum and were members of the Big South Conference. They finished the season 23–9, 13–5 in Big South play to win a share of the regular season conference championship. They defeated Presbyterian and Gardner–Webb to advance to the championship game of the Big South tournament where they lost to UNC Asheville. Despite the conference title and 23 wins, they did not participate in a postseason tournament.

Roster

Schedule

|-
!colspan=9 style="background:#8C2633; color:#FFD700;"| Regular season

|-
!colspan=9 style="background:#8C2633; color:#FFD700;"| Big South tournament

References

Winthrop Eagles men's basketball seasons
Winthrop
Winthrop Eagles men's basketball
Winthrop Eagles men's basketball